Marvelous is Misia's third studio album and first self-produced album, released on April 25, 2001. It sold 881,150 copies in its first week, peaked at #1 for two consecutive weeks, and spent five weeks in the Top 5. The first pressing of the album came in sleeve case packaging. Marvelous is the 118th best-selling album of all time in Japan. It came in at #8 on the overall yearly chart, however Marvelous was the second highest selling original album of 2001, behind Hikaru Utada's Distance.

Track listing

Charts

Oricon Sales Chart

Physical Sales Charts

References

External links
Sony Music Online Japan : MISIA

2001 albums
Misia albums
Japanese-language albums
Albums produced by Shirō Sagisu